Charles Rutherfoord (15 July 1863 – 1 April 1917) was a South African first-class cricketer. He played for Kimberley in the 1889–90 Currie Cup.

References

External links
 

1863 births
1917 deaths
South African cricketers
Griqualand West cricketers